Stewart John West (born 31 March 1934) is a former Australian politician. He represented the Australian Labor Party (ALP) in the House of Representatives from 1977 to 1993, holding the New South Wales seat of Cunningham. He was a member of cabinet in the Hawke Government, serving as Minister for Immigration and Ethnic Affairs (1983–1984), Housing and Construction (1984–1987), and Administrative Services (1987–1990).

Early life
West was born on 31 March 1934 in Forbes, New South Wales. Before entering parliament he was president of the Port Kembla branch of the Waterside Workers' Federation from 1972 to 1977. He also served as Rex Connor's campaign manager from 1966 to 1975.

Politics
West was elected to parliament in the Cunningham by-election on 15 October 1977, after the sudden death of the sitting member, Rex Connor. He was promoted to the shadow ministry of Bill Hayden in 1980.

When the Labor Party won government in the 1983 federal election, West was appointed Minister for Immigration and Ethnic Affairs in the Cabinet under Prime Minister Bob Hawke. As the only member of Labor's left-wing faction to be a Cabinet minister, West found himself at odds with the Labor Right-dominated Cabinet, and he resigned on 4 November 1983 when he was unable to support a Cabinet decision on uranium mining. He was reappointed to Cabinet on 3 April 1984, and served out the remaining parliamentary term as Immigration Minister.

West remained in Cabinet for the Hawke government's two subsequent terms as Minister for Housing and Construction from 1984 to 1987, and Minister for Administrative Services from 1987 to 1990. He resigned from Parliament on 8 February 1993 after losing pre-selection for the seat of Cunningham to Stephen Martin.

References

1934 births
Living people
Australian trade unionists
Australian Labor Party members of the Parliament of Australia
Members of the Australian House of Representatives
Members of the Australian House of Representatives for Cunningham
Members of the Cabinet of Australia
20th-century Australian politicians